The ornate Moorish Revival Leipzig Synagogue in Leipzig, Saxony, Germany, was built in 1855 by German Jewish architect Otto Simonson who had studied under Gottfried Semper, architect of the Semper Synagogue in Dresden. The synagogue stood proximately in the west of the inner city ring road on the corner plot Gottschedstraße 3 / Zentralstraße.

The synagogue was commissioned by the small Leipzig Jewish community and by Jewish merchants from throughout Europe who gathered for the annual Leipzig Trade Fair.

The interior featured horseshoe arches, an Aron Kodesh in the style of a mihrab and a pulpit in the style of a mimbar. Because so many businessmen gathered in Leipzig for the fairs, the synagogue is thought to have influenced the decision to build Moorish revival synagogues in other cities.

The synagogue was destroyed on Kristallnacht by the Nazi regime.

References

Jews and Judaism in Leipzig
Moorish Revival synagogues
Synagogues completed in 1855
Buildings and structures in Leipzig
Religion in Leipzig
Synagogues in Saxony
Synagogues destroyed during Kristallnacht (Germany)